Hethel is a small village in Norfolk, England, approximately  southeast of the market town of Wymondham, and approximately  south of the city of Norwich.

The village gave its name to the former RAF Hethel bomber station, which has been the location of the Head Office and factory of Lotus Cars since the 1960s. The Lotus Cars test track uses sections of the old RAF Hethel runway.

Hethel is noted for containing the oldest known living hawthorn tree in East Anglia and possibly in the United Kingdom (reputed to be more than 700 years old). Planted in the 13th century, "Hethel Old Thorn" (a specimen of Common Hawthorn, Crataegus monogyna) is in the village churchyard, which is classified as the smallest reserve under the care of the British Wildlife Trusts partnership..

The name 'Hethel' is derived from the older name 'Het Hill'.

Hethel Airfield

RAF Hethel was an airfield used by the US during the Second World War, and later by the RAF. From 14 September 1943 though to 12 June 1945, Hethel served as headquarters for the 2nd Combat Bombardment Wing of the 2nd Bomb Division.

After the departure of the Americans, it was assigned to RAF Fighter Command.  On 25 June Polish-manned North American Mustang RAF squadrons moved into the base. In mid-1947, Hethel became a Personnel Transit Centre but was transferred to RAF Technical Training Command.  With the downsizing of the RAF, the field was closed in 1948. For many years the base was inactive and abandoned until it was finally sold by the Air Ministry in 1964.

For a number of years the old airfield Nissen huts were used to house families awaiting re-housing under the post-war building programme.  Forehoe and Henstead RDC also used part of the area as a store depot. With the end of military control, Hethel became the manufacturing and testing site for Lotus Cars.  The manufacture of vehicles, originally started in the old hangars and workshops, now takes place in several modern buildings. Lotus uses parts of the airfield perimeter track and lengths of the main runway as a testing track.

Lotus Cars
 

In 1966 Lotus Cars moved into a purpose built factory on the site of the airfield and developed portions of the runways and taxiways as a test track for their cars.  The factory and engineering centres cover  of the former airfield and use  of runway. Much of the remaining runways have been removed and returned to agricultural use.  The layout can still be seen from aerial photos.

Lotus Cars designs and builds race and production automobiles of light weight and high handling characteristics. Colin Chapman, the founder of Lotus, died of a heart attack in 1982 at the age of 54, having begun life an innkeeper's son and become a multi-millionaire industrialist.  The car maker built tens of thousands of successful racing and road cars and won the Formula One World Championship seven times.  At the time of his death he was linked with the DeLorean Motor Company scandal over the use of government subsidies for the production of the Delorean for which Lotus had designed the chassis.

In 1986, the company was bought by General Motors.  On 27 August 1993, GM sold the company, for £30 million, to A.C.B.N. Holdings S.A. of Luxembourg, a company controlled by Italian businessman Romano Artioli, who also owned Bugatti Automobili SpA.  In 1996, a majority share in Lotus was sold to Perusahaan Otomobil Nasional Bhd (Proton), a Malaysian car company listed on the Kuala Lumpur Stock Exchange.

The company also acts as an engineering consultancy, providing engineering development—particularly of suspension—for other car manufacturers. The company's former racing arm, Team Lotus, and the Lotus Driving Academy were/are also based at Hethel.

Church of All Saints
All Saints Church displays an unusual juxtaposition of styles, from its square Saxon tower to the red-brick east end which includes the 18th-century Branthwaite family chapel on the north side of the chancel. It is a Grade I listed building .

References

External links

Map of Hethel (east)
Map of Hethel (west)
Historic map of Hethel (map made in 1842)
Photograph of Hethel Old Thorn
Hawthown Gallery (includes an image of Hethel Old Thorn)
Lotus Cars
Lotus Engineering
Lotus Driving Academy
Classic Team Lotus

South Norfolk
Villages in Norfolk